Panas is a surname that may refer to:

Marek Panas (born 1951), former Polish handball player
Lydia Panas (born 1958), American photographer
Photinos Panas (1832–1903), Greek ophthalmologist

The initials PANAS may refer to:

Positive and Negative Affect Schedule, measure for general affective states

See also
Pan, a Slavic honorific
Pan (disambiguation)